The 2004–05 season was the 57th season in the existence of FC Steaua București and the club's 57th consecutive season in the top flight of Romanian football. In addition to the domestic league, Steaua București participated in this season's editions of the Cupa României and the UEFA Cup.

First-team squad
Squad at end of season

Competitions

Overall record

Divizia A

League table

Results summary

Results by round

Matches

Cupa României

Results

UEFA Cup

Second qualifying round

First round

Group stage

Results

Knockout stage

Round of 32

Round of 16

References

FC Steaua București seasons
Steaua București
Romanian football championship-winning seasons